Half Pints Brewing Company  is a privately owned brewery in Winnipeg, Manitoba, Canada. Incorporated in August 2006, it is one of 15 craft breweries in Manitoba.

The brewery has grown its capacity and floor space, and has expanded its market west into Saskatchewan, Alberta, and British Columbia. As of 2013 Half Pints has a capacity of 34,000 hectolitres. In 2010, the capacity was 8,000 hectolitres, up from 1,500 hectolitres in 2006 when the brewery initially opened.

Half Pints is owned by David Rudge. Rudge is also the head brewmaster of the company. As of December 2016, Half Pints Brewing has 15 employees.

Products
Half Pints produces four flagship beers: St James Pale Ale, Bulldog Amber Ale, Little Scrapper IPA and Stir Stick Stout. The brewery also produces seasonal beers. In 2011, Half Pints introduced "Queer Beer", a brew for Winnipeg's Pride Festival. Proceeds from the beer are donated to Pride Winnipeg. The beer was brought back for a second season in 2012.

Reception
The company's products review well in Beer Advocate,<ref>"Half Pints Brewing Company at Beer Advocate.</ref> and have appeared in RateBeer's Best Beers of Canada list since 2008, with the Humulus Ludicrous scoring gold in each year.

See also

 List of breweries in Canada

 References 

Further reading
 Ben McFarland (2009), World's Best Beers: One Thousand Craft Brews from Cask to Glass, New York: Sterling Innovation, .
 Adrian Tierney-Jones ed. (2010), 1001 Beers You Must Taste Before You Die, Universe, .
 "Half Pints beers given nod in new book", in Winnipeg Free Press'', Sept. 30, 2009.

External links 
 

Beer brewing companies based in Manitoba
Manufacturing companies based in Winnipeg